Matthew Alexander Dryke (born August 21, 1958 in Port Angeles, Washington) is an American former sport shooter. He competed and won a gold medal in the 1984 Summer Olympics. He is a two-time world champion in skeet shooting, from 1983 and 1986, and earned a silver medal in 1987.

Dryke has been inducted into the USA Shooting Hall of fame.

Accomplishments
  1979 Pan American Games – silver – skeet
  1979 Pan American Games – gold team – skeet
  1979 World Moving Target Championships – gold team – skeet (world record – team)
  1981 Championships of the Americas – gold – skeet (world record)
  1981 Championships of the Americas – gold team – skeet (world record – team)
  1982 World Shooting Championships – gold team – skeet
  1983 Pan American Games – gold – skeet (world record)
  1983 World Moving Target Championships – gold – skeet
  1983 World Moving Target Championships – gold team – skeet
  1984 Olympic Games – gold – skeet
  1985 Championships of the Americas – gold – skeet
  1986 World Shooting Championships – gold – skeet (world record)
  1987 Pan American Games – gold – skeet
  1987 World Clay Target Championships – silver – skeet
 1988 Olympic Games – 24th – skeet
  1989 World Cup – Mexico City – gold – skeet
  1989 World Cup – Osijek – gold – skeet
  1989 World Cup – Suhl – bronze – skeet
  1992 World Cup – Los Angeles – gold – skeet
 1992 Olympic Games – 6th – skeet

References

External links
 
 

1958 births
Living people
American male sport shooters
United States Distinguished Marksman
Skeet shooters
Shooters at the 1984 Summer Olympics
Olympic gold medalists for the United States in shooting
Olympic medalists in shooting
Medalists at the 1984 Summer Olympics
Pan American Games medalists in shooting
Pan American Games gold medalists for the United States
Pan American Games silver medalists for the United States
Shooters at the 1979 Pan American Games
Shooters at the 1983 Pan American Games
Shooters at the 1987 Pan American Games
Medalists at the 1983 Pan American Games
Medalists at the 1987 Pan American Games